On 12 November 1996, Saudia Flight 763, a Boeing 747 en route from Delhi, India, to Dhahran, Saudi Arabia, and Kazakhstan Airlines Flight 1907, an Ilyushin Il-76 en route from Chimkent, Kazakhstan, to Delhi, collided over the village of Charkhi Dadri, around  west of Delhi. The crash killed all 349 people on board both planes, making it the world's deadliest mid-air collision and the deadliest aviation accident to occur in India. The crash was caused by failure of the Kazakhstani crew to maintain the correct altitude, because of confused dialogue with the tower communicated via the radio operator.

Aircraft involved

Saudi Arabian Airlines Flight 763

Saudi Arabian Airlines Flight 763 was a Boeing 747-168B, registration HZ-AIH, departing from Delhi as part of a scheduled international Delhi–Dhahran–Jeddah passenger service with 312 people on board. The crew on this flight consisted of Captain Khalid Al-Shubaily (age 45), First Officer Nazir Khan, and Flight Engineer Ahmed Edrees. Al-Shubaily was a veteran pilot with 9,837 flying hours.

There is some dispute as to the nationalities of the passengers of Flight 763. According to an article published on 14 November 1996, 215 Indians, many of whom worked in Saudi Arabia as blue-collar workers, boarded the flight, along with 40 Nepalis and three Americans. However, according to a different article, the passenger manifest included 17 people of other nationalities, including nine Nepalis, three Pakistanis, two Americans, one Bangladeshi, one British, and one Saudi Arabian. Twelve of the crew members, including five anti-terrorism officials, were Saudi Arabian citizens.

Kazakhstan Airlines Flight 1907

Kazakhstan Airlines Flight 1907, an Ilyushin Il-76TD with registration UN-76435 was on a charter service from Chimkent Airport to Delhi. The crew consisted of Captain Alexander Cherepanov (age 44), First Officer Ermek Dzhangirov, Flight Engineer Alexander Chuprov, Navigator Zhahanbek Aripbaev, and Radio Operator Egor Repp. Cherepanov was highly experienced, with 9,229 flight hours.

A company from Kyrgyzstan chartered the flight, and the passenger manifest mostly included ethnic Russian Kyrgyz citizens planning to go shopping in India. Thirteen Kyrgyz traders boarded the flight.

Collision
SVA Flight 763 departed Delhi at 18:32 local time (13:02 UTC). KZA Flight 1907 was descending simultaneously, to land at Delhi. Both flights were controlled by approach controller V.K. Dutta. At this time, Dutta advised the flight, "Identified traffic 12 o'clock, reciprocal Saudia Boeing 747, . Report in sight."

When the controller called Flight 1907 again, he received no reply. He tried to warn of the other flight's distance, but was too late. The two aircraft collided, with the left wing of the KZA flight slicing through the left wing of the SVA 747 while the left horizontal stabiliser of the 747 sliced off the vertical stablizer (including the horizontal stabilizer) of the KZA flight. With most of its left wing and vertical stablizer gone, the Ilyushin went into a flat spin and crashed into a field at a flat attitude near the wreckage of the Saudia plane. All 312 people on board SVA763 and all 37 people on KZA1907 were killed. 

The wreckage of the Saudi Arabian aircraft landed near Dhani village, Bhiwani District, Haryana. The wreckage of the Kazakh aircraft hit the ground near Birohar village, Rohtak District, Haryana.

Investigation and final report
The crash was investigated by the Lahoti Commission, headed by then-Delhi High Court judge Ramesh Chandra Lahoti. Depositions were taken from the Air Traffic Controllers Guild and the two airlines. The flight data recorders were decoded by Kazakhstan Airlines and Saudia under the supervision of air crash investigators in Moscow and Farnborough, England, respectively. The ultimate cause was held to be the failure of Kazakhstan Airlines Flight 1907's pilot to follow ATC instructions, whether due to cloud turbulence or due to communication problems.

The report ascribed the cause of this serious breach in operating procedure to the lack of English language skills on the part of the Kazakhstani aircraft pilots; they were relying entirely on their radio operator for communications with the ATC. The radio operator did not have his own flight instrumentation and had to look over the pilots' shoulders for a reading. Kazakhstani officials stated that the aircraft had descended while their pilots were fighting turbulence inside a bank of cumulus clouds.

Indian air controllers also complained that the Kazakhstani pilots sometimes confused their calculations because they are accustomed to using metre altitudes and kilometre distances, while most other countries use feet and nautical miles respectively for aerial navigation.

Just a few seconds from impact, the Kazakhstani plane climbed slightly and the two planes collided. This was because the radio operator of Kazakhstan 1907 discovered only then that they were not at 15,000 feet and asked the pilot to climb. The captain gave orders for full throttle, and the plane climbed, only to hit the oncoming Saudi Arabian plane. The tail of the Kazakhstani plane clipped the left wing of the Saudi Arabian jet, severing both parts from their respective planes. Had the Kazakhstani pilots not climbed slightly, it is likely that they would have passed under the Saudi Arabian plane.

The recorder of the Saudi Arabian plane revealed the pilots recited the prayer that is required, according to Islamic law, when one faces death. The counsel for the ATC Guild denied the presence of turbulence, quoting meteorological reports, but did state that the collision occurred inside a cloud. This was substantiated by the affidavit of Capt. Place, who was the commander of a Lockheed C-141B Starlifter, which was flying into New Delhi at the time of the crash. The members of his crew filed similar affidavits.

Furthermore, Indira Gandhi International Airport did not have secondary surveillance radar, which provides extra information, such as the aircraft's identity and altitude, by reading transponder signals; instead the airport had primary radar, which produces readings of distance and bearing, but not altitude. In addition, departures and arrivals both shared a single corridor within the civilian airspace around New Delhi. Most areas have separate corridors: one for departures and another one for arrivals. But the airspace of Delhi in 1996 had only one civilian corridor because much of the airspace was taken by the Indian Air Force. Due to the crash, the air-crash investigation report recommended changes to air-traffic procedures and infrastructure in New Delhi's air-space:

 Separation of inbound and outbound aircraft through the creation of 'air corridors'
 Installation of a secondary air-traffic control radar for aircraft altitude data
 Mandatory collision avoidance equipment on commercial aircraft operating in Indian airspace
 Reduction of the airspace over New Delhi that was formerly under exclusive control of the Indian Air Force

Aftermath
The Directorate General of Civil Aviation subsequently made it mandatory for all aircraft flying in and out of India to be equipped with an airborne collision avoidance system. This set a worldwide precedent for mandatory use of Traffic Collision Avoidance System.

As of 2021, there is an ongoing effort by the Charkhi Dadri district administration to develop a memorial honoring the victims of the mid-air collision. The proposed memorial, which would consist of names and other information of the victims, would be located at a to-be built memorial-park in the district. However, the district administration is waiting to get an approval for the project from the Haryana government, and plans to include the participation of Ministry of Civil Aviation of India, Airport Authority of India, and embassies of Saudi Arabia and Kazakhstan in the development of the memorial.

Documentaries
Miditech, a company based in Gurugram, Haryana, produced a documentary about the disaster called Head On!, which aired on the National Geographic Channel.

The disaster was also the subject of an episode in the documentary series Mayday (Air Crash Investigation) on 11 November 2009 entitled "Sight Unseen", also shown on the National Geographic Channel.

See also
 List of accidents and incidents involving airliners by airline

References

Citations

General references 
  (PDF)

Further reading 
 . . Obeikan, 2000. : Book by a Saudi pilot which discusses this incident
 Bhavya Dore. "Collision". Fifty Two. 9 October 2020.

External links 

Directorate General of Civil Aviation
 Final Report
 OPERATIONS CIRCULAR NO.3 OF 1999
 "Officials say hundreds feared killed in airline collision over India" (Archive). CNN. 12 November 1996.
 "Pilot error focus of India collision investigation" (Archive). CNN. 14 November 1996.
 Burns, John F. "Indian and Kazak Officials Trade Accusations in Air Collision." The New York Times. 15 November 1996.
Centre for Disaster Management (Haryana Institute of Public Administration)  Case Study: Charkhi Dadri Mid Air Collision
 New article on the crash
 Victims, crash site of the mid-air collision from Associated Press Archive

Airliner accidents and incidents caused by pilot error
Accidents and incidents involving the Boeing 747
Aviation accidents and incidents in 1996
Aviation accidents and incidents in India
1996 in India
Mid-air collisions
Mid-air collisions involving airliners
Accidents and incidents involving the Ilyushin Il-76
Kazakhstan Airlines accidents and incidents
Saudia accidents and incidents
1990s in Haryana
November 1996 events in Asia
Charkhi Dadri district